Bananskiva (English: Banana record, banana slice or, less commonly, banana feast) is a children's album by the Swedish folk singer-songwriter and guitar player Fred Åkerström together with Gösta Linderholm.

Track listing
 Banansång (Åkerström, Linderholm)
 Hur bananerna är (Åkerström)
 De goda (Gösta Linderholm)
 I bananskogen (Åkerström, Linderholm)
 I bananernas himmel (Gösta Linderholm)
 Fyra bananer (Åkerström, Linderholm)
 Banankyrkogården (Åkerström)
 Vaggvisa för en liten grön banan (Åkerström, Linderholm)
 Arg ung banan (Åkerström, Linderholm)
 En gammal banans tankar (Åkerström)
 Vad bananer tror (Åkerström, Linderholm)
 Vad bananer vet (Åkerström)
 Vad bananer vill (Linderholm)
 De trofasta (Åkerström, Linderholm)
 Under banaflaggan (Linderholm)
 Bananriket (Åkerström)

References

External links
 Lyrics
 YouTube
 Banansång
 Hur bananerna är
 De goda
 I bananskogen

1976 albums
Fred Åkerström albums
Swedish-language albums
Children's music albums by Swedish artists